Feskov (Cyrillic: Феськов) is a Slavic-language surname. Notable people with the surname include:

Alexander M. Feskov (born 1959), Ukrainian medical researcher

East Slavic-language surnames